Marlin Tyrell Jackson (born June 30, 1983) is a former American football player who last played for the Philadelphia Eagles of the National Football League.  He played college football for the University of Michigan, and was recognized as a consensus All-American.  The Indianapolis Colts selected him in the first round of the 2005 NFL Draft. Jackson won Super Bowl XLI with the Colts against the Chicago Bears.

Early years
Jackson was born in Sharon, Pennsylvania.  He attended Sharon High School, and played for the Sharon Tigers high school football team.  During his high school career, he compiled 281 career tackles, nineteen tackles for losses, three quarterback sacks, seven forced fumbles, three recovered fumbles and eighteen interceptions, including four touchdown returns.  On offense, was he rushed for 330 five touchdowns in fifteen attempts, and caught fifty-seven passes for 1,026 yards and eighteen touchdowns.  Jackson earned all-state honors, was the Pennsylvania high school player of the year and picked for the USA Today and Prep Football Report All-American teams.  He played in the first-ever U.S. Army All-American Bowl game on December 30, 2000.

College career
Jackson attended the University of Michigan, where he played for coach Lloyd Carr's Michigan Wolverines football team from 2001 to 2004.  As senior team captain in 2004, he was a first-team All-Big Ten selection, and a consensus first-team All-American, having received first-team honors from the Associated Press, American Football Coaches Association, Football Writers Association of American, The Sporting News, and ESPN.

Jackson finished his career as the second all-time leader among Michigan players in pass breakups.  During his senior year, opposing coaches and quarterbacks, concerned at Jackson's interception and pass break-up ability, threw less than fourteen percent of their passes in his direction.

Professional career

Indianapolis Colts
Jackson was selected by the Indianapolis Colts with the 29th overall pick of the 2005 NFL Draft. As an NFL rookie he had 52 tackles and one interception. Marlin played mostly in passing situations with one start in 15 games. In his second season, he had 82 tackles and 1 interception. He started at safety in place of the injured Bob Sanders. Marlin's career high was a 14 tackle performance against the Houston Texans.

On January 21, 2007, Jackson intercepted New England Patriots quarterback Tom Brady with 18 seconds left in the fourth quarter of the AFC Championship Game to seal the Colts' 38-34 victory and send them to Super Bowl XLI against the Chicago Bears, which they subsequently won.

On October 30, 2008, Jackson injured his knee during practice. Marlin had surgery to repair the damage and missed the remainder of the 2008 season. Yahoo! Sports delivered an update on his status on June 25 saying that he "looks to be making strong progress from midseason knee surgery."

On March 5, 2010, Jackson was declared a free agent after he was non-tendered by the Colts.

Philadelphia Eagles
Jackson was signed to a two-year, $6 million contract with the Philadelphia Eagles on March 10, 2010. There, he would be converted from cornerback to free safety.

Jackson suffered a right Achilles tendon rupture in a mini-camp practice on June 1. He was placed on the injured reserve list on June 10.

Jackson was released on September 3, 2011, during final roster cuts.

NFL statistics

Key
 GP: games played
 COMB: combined tackles
 TOTAL: total tackles
 AST: assisted tackles
 SACK: sacks
 FF: forced fumbles
 FR: fumble recoveries
 FR YDS: fumble return yards 
 INT: interceptions
 IR YDS: interception return yards
 AVG IR: average interception return
 LNG: longest interception return
 TD: interceptions returned for touchdown
 PD: passes defensed

Personal
His older brother Elmarko Jackson was a running back for Temple University. He was involved in an incident which made headlines in 2000 when he was stabbed several times on campus after an argument with another student.

Legal
Jackson was charged with felonious assault in the summer of 2003. A 26-year-old man accused Jackson of striking him in the right eye with a bottle on June 1, requiring 17 stitches, in Ann Arbor, Michigan.

On February 19, 2009, Jackson won the civil lawsuit regarding this incident. Not only did the jury find Jackson not liable for any damages, they rejected the claim that he attacked the plaintiff with a bottle, found the plaintiff liable for defamation and malicious prosecution, and awarded Jackson $225,000 in damages.

References

External links
 Philadelphia Eagles bio
 Indianapolis Colts bio

1983 births
Living people
People from Sharon, Pennsylvania
Players of American football from Pennsylvania
African-American players of American football
American football cornerbacks
American football safeties
Michigan Wolverines football players
All-American college football players
Indianapolis Colts players
Philadelphia Eagles players
21st-century African-American sportspeople
20th-century African-American people
Ed Block Courage Award recipients